The Dhar iron pillar is a now-fragmented iron column located in the Dhar town of Madhya Pradesh, India. The exact origins of the pillar are unknown, but according to the local tradition, it was a victory column erected by the 11th century Paramara king Bhoja.

Three of its fragments are now located near the 15th century Lat Masjid ("pillar mosque"), which is named after the pillar (called "lāṭ" in Hindi). A fourth portion is believed to be missing. The original pillar tapered from bottom to top: the bottom fragment has a square cross-section; the middle fragment has square and octagonal cross-sections, and the top fragment has an octagonal cross-section with a small circular part at the end. The combined weight of the fragments is estimated at around 7300 kg, which is at least 1,000 kg more than the Delhi pillar's weight. At the time of its erection, it was probably the largest forge-welded iron pillar in the world.

Manufacturing and erection 

The pillar does not bear an inscription mentioning its erector, date or purpose. It is located at Dhar, which was the capital of the Paramara dynasty. According to the local tradition, the pillar commemorates a military victory of the 11th century Paramara king Bhoja, whose knowledge of iron metallurgy can be seen in his book Yuktikalpataru. Henry Cousens of Archaeological Survey of India (ASI) theorized that it was constructed by the later Paramara king Arjunavarman in 1210 CE, from the molten arms of an enemy force.

The Lat Masjid, in whose compound the pillar is located, was constructed with spolia from Hindu and Jain temples. R. Balasubramaniam theorizes that a Shiva temple previously occupied the site, and the pillar was originally located at the front of this temple, with a trishula (trident) at the top.

The two largest fragments have a number of holes at irregular intervals, on all sides. Because they are distributed unevenly, they do not appear to be slots for lamps (as in a deepa-stambha). Cousens speculated that these were used by the forgers and welders to handle the pillar with their instruments during the manufacturing process. Roessler agreed with this hypothesis, and proposed that these slots were also used to hold the pillar upright using iron anchors.

The pillar appears to have been built using horizontal forge welding technique.

Fragments 

The iron pillar of Dhar was originally longer than the iron pillar of Delhi. After the Muslim conquest of Dhar, it broke into at least two pieces. The smaller piece was planted at the Dilawar Khan's Mosque in Mandu. The larger piece was erected in front of the Lat Masjid constructed by Dilawar Khan in 1405.

In 1531 CE, Dhar came under the control of Bahadur Shah, the Sultan of Gujarat. He made an attempt to carry the large piece to Gujarat. In this process, this part of the pillar toppled and fragmented into two pieces.

Now, three fragments of the pillar are placed horizontally on a platform near Lat Masjid. These fragments were moved by ASI to their present position in 1980. Thus, the original pillar must have been almost twice as high and at least 1,000 kg heavier than the iron pillar of Delhi. At the time of its erection, it was probably the tallest and the largest forge-welded iron pillar in the world.

Fragment 1 

This piece is the larger part of the fragment broken during Bahadur Shah's reign. It has a square cross-section. Roessler estimated its weight at 4,500 kg.

In 1598, the Mughal emperor Akbar's visit to Dhar was recorded on the pillar in form of a Persian language inscription. This piece also has some names and letters in Devanagari script. The names end in word Soni ("goldsmith"), and seem to have been engraved while the original pillar was still intact. There are some other symbols and Persian characters scratched on the surface.

The autobiography of Akbar's son Jahangir mentions that he saw this piece lying on ground in Dhar. He ordered it to be taken to Agra, intending to use it as a lamp post in the courtyard of Akbar's tomb. It appears that Jahangir's orders were never carried out.

Until 1980, this piece lay in a sloping position against a masonry terrace. The local kids used it as a slide, because of which a large part of its surface gained a polished appearance.

Fragment 2 

This piece is the smaller part of the fragment broken during Bahadur Shah's reign. The part with the square cross-section measured 8'6", while the part with the octagonal section measured . Roessler estimated its weight at 1,800 kg.

The  piece was removed from the Lat Masjid site at an unknown time. In February 1903, Henry Cousens of ASI found it in Anand High School, where a museum had been set up in 1902. The museum was relocated to another site between the years 1922 and 1942. When this happened, the pillar was brought back to the Lat Masjid and placed horizontally on the ground.

Fragment 3 

This is the smallest piece, which was moved to Mandu during Dilawar Khan's reign. Its length is  according to both Coussen and Roessler. It is mostly of an octagonal cross-section, except one  circular part at the end. Roessler estimated its weight at 940 kg.

This piece was brought back from Mandu to Dhar sometime between 1844 and 1893. In 1893, A. A. Führer of ASI noticed it in the garden of the Dhar Maharaja's guest house. In February 1902, this piece was fixed in a masonry basement at Lal Bagh public gardens near the Anand High School. Henry Cousens of ASI later had it removed from the basement to measure it. The piece was then moved to the Anand High School museum. From there, it was moved to Lat Masjid, similar to the second piece.

Missing fragment 

The third piece has a fractured top surface, which indicates that a fourth piece of the original pillar is missing. Henry Cousens hypothesized that the fourth piece had a garuda figure (the Paramara royal emblem) or a trishula (trident) at the top. As Bhoja was a Shaivite king, R. Balasubramaniam analyzed Shaivite iconography to conclude that the top had a trishula.

Balasubramaniam also theorizes that an iron pillar in front of Mandu's Jami Masjid might be a re-shaped version of the Dhar pillar's missing piece. This pillar is called Allaudin's Sang (spear) after Alauddin Khalji.

Chemical composition 

According to R. Balasubramaniam and A. V. Ramesh Kumar (2003), the pillar shows "excellent" atmospheric corrosion resistance.

Ray et al. (1997) analyzed portions of the two smaller fragments. Their analysis revealed the following chemical composition (weight %):

Balasubramaniam (2002) also obtained a small portion of the pillar with ASI's permission, and used an electron probe microanalyzer to analyze its chemical composition. He found that "the composition varied from one location to another":

The typical composition of the slag was 55.8% iron, 27.8% silicon, 16.3% phosphorus, and 0.1% manganese.

See also

References

Bibliography 
 
 

Dhar
Paramara dynasty
Monumental columns in India
Metallurgical industry in India
History of metallurgy
Bhoja
Archaeological artifacts of India